The People's Primary Healthcare Initiative KP (PPHI), also known as Khyber Pakhtunkhwa Health Programme, is a programme with the objective of developing primary level healthcare facilities to benefit patients at grassroots level, in the province of Khyber Pakhtunkhwa and Federally Administered Tribal Areas, Pakistan.

Features 
The People's Primary Healthcare Initiative in Khyber Pakhtunkhwa and elsewhere in Pakistan were created following a World Bank report prepared in light of the World Health Organization Health Model, seeking a shift from curative to preventive and promotive health care.

The government awarded contracts to the non-governmental organisations to manage BHUs by improving presence of staff, equipment and medicines. The organisations act as consultants, as they receive the total budget of the districts and fill vacant posts and make prompt purchases of medicines, equipments etc. to insure that patients get treatment. The programme offers grant incentives to doctors and other healthcare staff by attracting them to serve in the rural and remote areas of the province.

In Khyber-Pakhtunkhwa (K-P), the management of primary healthcare infrastructure was transferred to the Sarhad Rural Support Programme (SRSP) from 2007 to 2016. There are over 625 basic health units (BHU's) across Khyber Pakhtunkhwa and in agencies of the Federally Administered Tribal Areas (FATA).

In 2016 a legal and administrative disagreement arose between the PTI lead Provincial Government and the Sarhad Rural Support Programme (SRSP). It was decided that the programme would devolve back to the administrative control of the Health Department.

See also
 Healthcare in Pakistan

References

External links 
 PPHI Official Webpage

Health in Khyber Pakhtunkhwa
Medical and health organisations based in Pakistan